Caetano is a Portuguese given name and surname derived from Latin Caietanus. It also appears in Lusophone place names named after Saint Cajetan (São Caetano in Portuguese).

People with the given name Caetano
 Caetano Prósperi Calil, Brazilian footballer playing for AC Siena
 Caetano Veloso, Brazilian composer and singer

People with the surname Caetano
 Israel Adrián Caetano, Uruguayan-born filmmaker of Portuguese descent
 Marcelo Caetano, prime minister of Portugal from 1968 to 1974
 Raffael Caetano de Araújo, Brazilian free agent footballer
 Rui Caetano, Portuguese footballer

Toponyms
 São Caetano (Madalena), a parish in Madalena, Azores
 São Caetano (Cantanhede), a parish in Cantanheda, Azores
 São Caetano do Sul, a city in Brazil

See also
 Caetano v. Massachusetts, a Supreme Court of the United States gun control case
 Salvador Caetano, a coachbuilder and vehicle distributor based in Portugal

References 

Portuguese masculine given names
Portuguese-language surnames